Cosmosoma pudica is a moth of the subfamily Arctiinae. It was described by Herbert Druce in 1894. It is found in Costa Rica.

References

pudica
Moths described in 1894